Kanjut Sar, or Kunjudh Sar as pronounced in Wakhi, is a mountain located in the Shimshal Valley, part of the Karakoram mountain range. The name Kunjudh Sar in Wakhi means "that which overlooks Kunjudh", or "above Kunjudh", while Khujudh is the Wakhi name for Central Hunza. It is the 28th-highest mountain on Earth and the 11th-highest in Pakistan. According to many residents of Shimshal, Kanjut Sar is the name of the adjacent peak Yukshin Gardan Sar, and vice versa. In Shimshal village, the original namings are widely accepted and used, as opposed to what is recognised internationally.

Kanjut Sar consists of two peaks:

Kanjut Sar I was first climbed in 1959 by Camillo Pellissier, member of an Italian expedition directed by Guido Monzino. Between 4 and 6 August 1981, seven Japanese climbers of the same expedition climbed to the top. In 2010, a Russian–American expedition attempted to climb on the Eastern Ridge of Kanjut Sar and reached 7450 m, but turned back in bad weather.

The first ascent of Kanjut Sar II was achieved by a Swiss team in 1985.  Expedition leader Toni Spirig, Ueli Stahel and Richie Ott finally carried it out in alpine style after several attempts . The climbers reached the summit on July 10. The ascent route led over the north-west side.

On July 29, 1990, a Dutch expedition made the second ascent of Kanjut Sar II in alpine style via the south face. Expedition members were Peter Kok, Frank Schmidt, Franck van den Barselaer, Hendrik Freie and Pieter de Kam.

See also
 Highest mountains of the world
 List of Ultras of the Karakoram and Hindu Kush
 List of mountains in Pakistan

References

External links
 Northern Pakistan - highly detailed placemarks of towns, villages, peaks, glaciers, rivers and minor tributaries in Google Earth

Seven-thousanders of the Karakoram
Mountains of Gilgit-Baltistan